Miloš Ćojbašić (born August 11, 2000) is a Serbian professional basketball player for Shumen of the National Basketball League of Bulgaria.

Early career 
Ćojbašić started playing basketball for KK Borča in Belgrade. In 2016, he joined KK Zemun. In summer 2017, he became a member of Crvena zvezda youth system. With Crvena Zvezda he was 2 time Champion in Serbian championship league. Ćojbašić also won the second place at the 2017–18 Junior ABA League season with the Crvena Zvezda. Over six tournament games, he averaged 5.2 points and 1.8 rebounds per game. He also won the second place at the 2018–19 Junior ABA League season with the Crvena Zvezda.

Professional career 
In January 2018, Ćojbašić signed his first professional contract with Crvena zvezda and he played for Crvena zvezda youth system. In August 2018, he was loaned out to Žarkovo of the Second League of Serbia.

In August 2019, Ćojbašić was added to Sloga of the Second League of Serbia. After three months Ćojbašić signed with the Bulgarian club Tundja Yambol. However, a few months čater he joined Cherno More Ticha Varna.

In December 2020, Ćojbašić signed with Kolubara LA 2003.

In September 2021, Miloš Ćojbašić signed 2 year contract with Shumen.

References

External links 
 Profile at eurobasket.com
 Profile at euroleague.net
 Profile at realgm.com
 Profile at ABA League
 Profile at NBL Bulgaria League

2000 births
Living people
Basketball League of Serbia players
Basketball players from Belgrade
BC Yambol players
KK Crvena zvezda youth players
KK Kolubara players
KK Sloga players
KK Žarkovo players
Centers (basketball)
Serbian expatriate basketball people in Bulgaria
Serbian men's basketball players
Power forwards (basketball)